Sean Maxwell Douglas (born May 27, 1983) is an American songwriter and record producer. A Grammy Award-winner for his work on Lizzo's Cuz I Love You, he co-wrote Thomas Rhett's "Die a Happy Man", which won the ACM Award for Single of the Year, the Billboard Music Award for Top Country Song, the CMA Award for Single of the Year and the BMI Award for Song of the Year. The song, released in 2016, was also nominated for the Grammy Award for Best Country Song.

Signed to Warner Chappell Music, and previously signed to Sony/ATV Music Publishing, Douglas co-wrote his first Top 10 single, Demi Lovato's “Heart Attack,” in 2013. He later wrote for Jessie J, Fifth Harmony, Nick Jonas, Chris Brown, Madonna, Andy Grammer, The Chainsmokers, Kesha, Selena Gomez, Dan + Shay, and Sia.

Douglas lives in Los Angeles. The son of actors Michael Keaton and Caroline McWilliams, he attended Washington University in St. Louis.  He and his wife, Rachel Bartov, were married in 2014.

Selected discography

References

1983 births
Living people
21st-century American male musicians
21st-century American musicians
American male songwriters
Musicians from Los Angeles
Record producers from Los Angeles
Songwriters from California
Washington University in St. Louis alumni